Be the One may refer to:

 Be the One (album), a 1989 album by Jackie Jackson
 "Be the One" (BoA song), 2003
 "Be the One" (Dua Lipa song), 2015
 "Be the One" (Moby song), a 2011 EP
 "Be the One" (Poison song), 2000
 "Be the One" (The Ting Tings song), 2008
 "Be the One", a song by Jack Peñate from Everything Is New
 "Be the One", a 2011 song by Lloyd, Trey Songz and Young Jeezy from King of Hearts
 "Be the One", a song by Yes from Keys to Ascension
 "Be the One", a song by Pandora from Kamen Rider Build
 "Be the One", a song by Jeremy Camp from Restored

See also
 I Could Be the One (disambiguation)